Satu Huotari (born 13 March 1967) is a Finnish retired ice hockey player. She competed with the Finnish national team from 1991 through 1999 and won a bronze medal in the women's ice hockey tournament at the 1998 Winter Olympics; bronze medals at the IIHF World Women's Championship in 1992, 1994, and 1999; gold medals at the IIHF European Women Championships in 1993 and 1995, and a bronze medal at the 1996 IIHF European Women Championships.

References

External links 

 

1967 births
Living people
Sportspeople from Oulu
Finnish women's ice hockey defencemen
Ice hockey players at the 1998 Winter Olympics
Olympic bronze medalists for Finland
Olympic ice hockey players of Finland
Olympic medalists in ice hockey
Medalists at the 1998 Winter Olympics
Oulun Kärpät Naiset players